Ana Laura Galindo Domínguez (born 25 February 1985) is a Mexican football manager for the Mexico women's national under-17 team.

Managerial career

Club America Femenil 
Ana Galindo was an assistant coach for Club América Femenil from 2017 to 2019. Ana Galindo won the Apertura 2018 as an assistant coach for Club America Femenil.

Mexico U-15 women's national football team 
Ana Galindo became head coach of the Mexico women's national under-15 football team in 2019. Ana Galindo won the  Dallas International Girls Cup 2019.

Mexico U-17 women's national football team 
Ana Galindo was named head coach of the Mexico women's national under-17 football team on January 19, 2021.

Mexico U-20 women's national football team 
After Mexico women's national under-20 football team manager Maribel Domínguez and her staff were suspended and separated from the team by the FMF, Galindo was named as interim manager of the team on July 21, 2022, ahead of the upcoming 2022 U-20 Women's World Cup.

Honours

Assistant Coach 

Club America Femenil
Liga MX Femenil: Apertura 2018

Manager 
Mexico U-15 women's national football team
Dallas International Girls Cup 2019

References

1985 births
Living people
Mexican football managers